Rebel (originally the Docks Nightclub & Concert Theater and then Sound Academy) is a nightclub and concert venue located on the Polson Pier in Toronto, Canada. Relaunched in October 2016 as Rebel Night Club, the complex is on the edge of Lake Ontario, overlooking the Toronto city skyline. The main room has a 65-foot stage with an installation of LED video walls, as well as outdoor grand terraces. The mezzanine hosts the central bar which includes built-in seating. 

The venue opened as "the Docks Nightclub" in 1996. A major renovation in 2016 split the venue into four rooms: "The Main Room", "Noir", "Savage" and the "Purple Room". The entire venue (as a whole) can house 3,700, with the concert venue holding up to 2,500 spectators.

History
The club has gone through several ownerships changes over the past two decades. After former Docks owner Jerry Sprackman lost his liquor licence, Polson Pier Entertainment (PPE) took over. A newly formed company called Maya Corp. applied for the liquor licence. Charles Khabouth owns 42.5 per cent of Maya, his business partner Daniel Soberano and a group controlled by PPE each own 25 per cent, and Ralph Soberano owns 7.5 per cent. Venture capitalist Michael Kimel soon entered the picture and started a new company with Khabouth and others called "Powerhouse".

At the end of 2015, Khabouth began a reported $10-million renovation of the complex (which was then called Sound Academy) and the adjoining outdoor Cabana Pool Bar. After 10 months, the complex reopened under the name Rebel. The Rebel complex has four rooms, a 65-foot stage, LED video walls, a grand terrace overlooking the city skyline, and a central bar.

References

Nightclubs in Toronto
Music venues in Toronto
Theatres in Toronto